Fosun Group may refer to:
 Fosun International Holdings, a British Virgin Islands incorporated company, ultimate parent company of Fosun International. Along with its subsidiaries were sometimes referred as Fosun Group
 Fosun Holdings, a Hong Kong incorporated company, intermediate parent company of Fosun International. Along with its subsidiaries were sometimes referred as Fosun Group
 Fosun International, a Hong Kong publicly traded company incorporated in 2004, sometimes refer as Fosun Group
 Fosun High Technology, a wholly owned subsidiary of Fosun International, incorporated in 1994 in China, Fosun International's major holding company in the mainland China, often refer as Fosun Group

Fosun may refer to:
 Fesun, sometimes spelled as Fosun, a place in Iran

See also
 Fosun Pharmaceutical, a Chinese publicly traded company which Fosun International was the largest shareholder; fullname was Shanghai Fosun Pharmaceutical (Group); formerly known as Fosun Industrial
 Shanghai Forte Land, former listed company of Fosun Group
 Fosun Foundation, a Chinese non-profit foundation that was supported by Fosun Group